Dougherty is a surname of Irish origin.  It may refer to many people.

It is a phonetic transcription of O'Dochartaigh, meaning "descendant of Dochartach," and is a variation of Doherty.

A
Andrew B. Dougherty (1863–1928), American politician from Michigan
Archibald K. Dougherty (1835–1923), American politician from Michigan

C
Charles Dougherty
Charles Dougherty (baseball) (1879–1939), American baseball player in the pre-Negro leagues
Charles Dougherty (Florida politician) (1850-1915), Democrat U.S. Representative from Florida
Charles Dougherty (Georgia politician) (1801-1853), American politician from Georgia and Whig candidate from Georgia
Charles F. Dougherty (born 1937), U.S. Representative from Pennsylvania
Charles J. Dougherty (born 1949), President of Duquesne University in Pittsburgh, Pennsylvania
Charlie Dougherty (1862–1925), baseball player
Christopher Dougherty (born 1988), Irish cricketer

D
Dennis A. Dougherty (born 1952), American professor of chemistry at California Institute of Technology
Dennis Joseph Dougherty (1865–1951), American cardinal of the Roman Catholic Church

E
Ellsworth Dougherty (1921–1965), American biologist
Ethan Dougherty math teacher for Siuslaw middle school 1972-

G
George Samuel Dougherty (1865-1931), American detective and law enforcement officer
Gill Dougherty (born 1961), French singer-songwriter

I
Ivan Dougherty (1907-1998), Australian Army officer during World War I who eventually attained the rank of Major General

J
John Dougherty (born 1964), Northern Irish writer and poet
John Joseph Dougherty (1907-1986), American Catholic bishop
Joseph Patrick Dougherty (1905-1970), American Catholic bishop

K
Kevin Dougherty (born 1962), associate justice of the Supreme Court of Pennsylvania

M
Mark Dougherty (1967–), American Soccer Player from California.
Marion Dougherty (1923-2011), American casting director
Michael Dougherty, American screenwriter

P
Patrick Dougherty
Patrick Dougherty (bishop) (1931-2010), Australian Roman Catholic Bishop
Patrick Dougherty (Medal of Honor) (1844-?), American Civil War sailor and Medal of Honor recipient
Pat Dougherty (born 1948), American politician and Missouri state legislator
Patsy Dougherty (1876-1940), American baseball player
Paul Dougherty (1877-1947), American Impressionist painter

R
Richard Dougherty (born 1932), American Olympic ice hockey player
Richard E. Dougherty (1880–1961), American civil engineer

T
J. Thomas Dougherty, American diplomat

W
Walter Hampden Dougherty (1879-1955), American actor and theatre manager
William Dougherty (1932-2010), American politician who served as Lieutenant Governor of South Dakota

See also

Doherty (surname)
Docherty (surname)

References